Carlo Mairani (February 16, 1883 – July 18, 1959) was an Italian professional road racing cyclist. He competed in the 1905 Giro di Lombardia, 1906 Giro di Lombardia and 1908 Giro di Lombardia

Major results
1905
5th Giro di Lombardia
1906
8th Giro di Lombardia
1908
4th Giro di Lombardia

References

1883 births
1959 deaths
Italian male cyclists
Cyclists from Milan